Stimulator of chondrogenesis 1 is a protein that in humans is encoded by the SCRG1 gene.

Function

Scrapie-responsive gene 1 is associated with neurodegenerative changes observed in transmissible spongiform encephalopathies. It may play a role in host response to prion-associated infections. The scrapie responsive protein 1 may be partly included in the membrane or secreted by the cells due to its hydrophobic N-terminus. In addition, the encoded protein can interact with bone marrow stromal cell antigen 1 (BST1) to enhance the differentiation potentials of human mesenchymal stem cells during tissue and bone regeneration. [provided by RefSeq, Jul 2016].

References

Further reading